Waiau River is a river in the Gisborne Region of New Zealand. It has its headwaters in the same area of hill country to the east of the Raukumara Range as the Mata River, flowing firstly north, then east to become a tributary of the Hikuwai River.

References

Rivers of the Gisborne District
Rivers of New Zealand